Tarahara (तरहरा) is a town in the Sunsari District of Nepal. It is located on the Koshi Highway in between Itahari and Dharan.

Populated places in Sunsari District